The 2009 season was the 104th season of competitive football in Norway.

Men's football

League season

Promotion and relegation

Tippeligaen

1. divisjon

2. divisjon

3. divisjon

Cup competitions

Norwegian Cup

Final

Superfinalen

Women's football

League season

Promotion and relegation

Toppserien

1. divisjon

Norwegian Women's Cup

Final
 Team Strømmen 0–1 Røa

Men's UEFA competitions

Champions League

Qualifying phase

Second qualifying round

|}

Third qualifying round

|}

UEFA Europa League

Qualifying phase

First qualifying round

|}

Second qualifying round

|}

Third qualifying round

|}

Play-off round

|}

UEFA Women's Champions League

Qualifying round

Group G

Matches (played in Osijek, Croatia)
 Team Strømmen 5–0 Levadia Tallinn
 Osijek 0–9 Team Strømmen
 Team Strømmen 0–1 Everton

Main round

Round of 32

|}

Round of 16

|}

Quarter-finals

|}

National teams

Norway men's national football team

2010 FIFA World Cup qualification (UEFA)

Group 9

Fixtures and results

Key
 H = Home match
 A = Away match
 N = Neutral ground

Norway women's national football team

Notes and references

 
Seasons in Norwegian football